Vittorio Casatti (born 8 May 1938) is an Italian former professional racing cyclist. He rode in the 1960 Tour de France.

References

External links
 

1938 births
Living people
Italian male cyclists
Cyclists from Bergamo